Betanzos is a comarca in the Galician Province of A Coruña. The overall population of this local region is 38,083 (2019).

Municipalities
There are ten municipalities in the comarca:

Aranga, Betanzos, Coirós, Curtis, Irixoa, Miño, Oza-Cesuras, Paderne, Vilarmaior and Vilasantar.

References

Comarcas of the Province of A Coruña